Nyctography is a form of substitution cipher writing created by Lewis Carroll (Charles Lutwidge Dodgson) in 1891.

Nyctography is written with a nyctograph (also invented by Carroll) and uses a system of dots and strokes all based on a dot placed in the upper left corner. Using the Nyctograph, one could quickly jot down ideas or notes without the aid of light.

Carroll invented the Nyctograph and Nyctography because he was often awakened during the night with thoughts that needed to be written down immediately, and didn't want to go through the lengthy process of lighting a lamp just to have to extinguish it shortly thereafter.

Nyctograph
The device consisted of a gridded card with sixteen square holes, each a quarter inch wide, and system of symbols representing an alphabet of Carroll's design, which could then be transcribed the following day. 

Initially, Carroll used an oblong of card with an oblong cut out of the centre to guide his writing in the dark. This did not appear to be satisfactory as the results were illegible. The new and final version of the nyctograph is recorded in his journal of September 24, 1891, and is the subject of a letter to The Lady magazine of October 29, 1891: 

From the description it appears that Carroll’s nyctograph was a single row of 16 boxes cut from a piece of card. Carroll would enter one of his symbols in each box, then move the card down to the next line (which, in the darkness, probably, he would have to estimate) and then repeat the process.

Nyctographic alphabet

Each character had a large dot or circle in the upper-left corner. Beside the 26 letters of the alphabet, there were five additional characters for 'and', 'the', the corners of the letter 'f' to indicate that the following characters were digits ('figures'), the corners of the letter 'l' to indicate that they were letters, and the corners of the letter 'd' to indicate that the following six characters were a date in DDMMYY format. There was no capitalization, punctuation or digits per se, though modern font designers have created them (e.g. capitals may be double-scored, punctuation marks may have the large dot at the bottom right corner, digits at the bottom left).

Numbers
Letters were assigned to represent digits. The values were taken from his Memoria Technica, which assigned two consonants to each digit, with vowels unassigned, so that any number could be read off as a word. For nyctography, one of the consonants was used for each digit. Most are the initials of the numerals, as follows. (In brackets are the other values of the Memoria Technica, which apart from leftover j for 3 have their own motivations.)

 1 – b (first consonant) [also c]
 2 – d (for duo and deux) [also w of 'two']
 3 – t (for 'three') [also j]
 4 – f (for 'four') [also q of quatre]
 5 – l (roman numeral 50) [also v of 'five']
 6 – s (for 'six') [also x of 'six']
 7 – m (final of septem) [also p of septem]
 8 – h (for huit) [also k]
 9 – n (for 'nine') [also g]
 0 – z (for 'zero') [also r of 'zero']

See also
 Pigpen cipher
 Night writing

References

External links

 Alice's Adventures in Carroll's Own Square Alphabet — Lewis Carroll Society of North America
 Nyctograph Machine printer

History of technology
Works by Lewis Carroll
Writing systems
Writing systems introduced in the 1890s
1891 in England